Juan Francisco Rodríguez Márquez (12 November 1949 – 16 April 2019) was a Spanish boxer. As an amateur he won the 1971 European flyweight title and reached the quarterfinals at the 1972 Summer Olympics. At the 1976 Games he was stopped in the second bout by the eventual silver medalist Charles Mooney.

After the 1976 Olympics Rodríguez turned professional and fought until 1982. He challenged Carlos Zárate Serna for the Mexican's WBC world bantamweight title in a 1977 fight held at Madrid, but lost by technical knockout. Next year he won the European title.

1976 Olympic record
Below are the results of Juan Francisco Rodriguez, a Spanish bantamweight boxer, who competed at the 1976 Montreal Olympics:

 Round of 64: defeated Anthony Abacheng (Ghana) on points, 5-0
 Round of 32: lost to Charles Mooney (United States) on points, 1-4

References

1949 births
2019 deaths
Sportspeople from Almería
Bantamweight boxers
Boxers at the 1972 Summer Olympics
Boxers at the 1976 Summer Olympics
Olympic boxers of Spain
Spanish male boxers
Mediterranean Games bronze medalists for Spain
Competitors at the 1971 Mediterranean Games
Mediterranean Games medalists in boxing
20th-century Spanish people
21st-century Spanish people